Associazione Calcio Tuttocuoio 1957 San Miniato, commonly known as Tuttocuoio, is an Italian association football club located in , a frazione of San Miniato, Tuscany. It currently plays in Eccellenza.

History 
It was renamed as A.S.D. Tuttocuoio Calcio in 1959.

Serie D 
The team was promoted to Serie D in the summer of 2010, after winning the Promozione Tuscany in the 2008–09 season.

The club in the season 2009–10 obtained a prestigious tripletta: winning the Coppa Italia Dilettanti 2008–09, obtaining direct promotion to Serie D, having also previously won the Regional Coppa Italia Tuscany, alongside the Eccellenza Tuscany league.

Lega Pro 
In 2012–13, Tuttocuoio won the Serie D Girone A and thus ensured promotion to Lega Pro Seconda Divisione for the first time ever. As a professional club, Tuttocuoio ended its first season in tenth place and ensured a spot for the 2014–15 Lega Pro after defeating Aversa Normanna and Arzanese in the playoffs.

Return to amateur football 
After being relegated back to Serie D in 2017, Tuttocuoio moved back to their original home venue in Ponte a Egola, after having played their professional seasons at the Stadio Libero Masini of neighbouring town Santa Croce sull'Arno.

In 2020, Tuttocuoio suffered another relegation, this time to Eccellenza.

Colors and badge 
The club colours are green and black.

Honours 

Eccellenza Tuscany:
 Winner (1): 2009–10
 Coppa Italia Dilettanti:
Champion (1): 2009–10
Regional Coppa Italia Tuscany:
Winner (1): 2009–10

References

External links 
Official Website

Football clubs in Tuscany
Association football clubs established in 1957
Serie C clubs
1957 establishments in Italy